The letter Ƭ (minuscule: ƭ), called T with hook, is a letter of the Latin alphabet based on the letter t. It is used in the Serer language.

Its lower case form, ƭ, formerly represented a voiceless alveolar implosive in the International Phonetic Alphabet.

The uppercase is in the Latin Extended-B range and the lowercase is in the IPA range.

Encoding

Latin letters with diacritics
Phonetic transcription symbols